Nick Dodson is a Canadian musician.  He is best known as the drummer for the band Parallels. He is the son of Rich Dodson, composer and guitarist in ’70s Canadian rock band The Stampeders with their hit "Sweet City Woman".

References

External links
 Dodson's official site

Canadian drummers
Canadian male drummers
Living people
Year of birth missing (living people)